The Portuguese bowline (also known as the French bowline and Lisbon surprise) is a variant of the bowline with two loops. The two loops are adjustable in size. Rope can be pulled from one loop into the other, even after tightening. The knot can be used as a makeshift Bosun's chair.

Tying
It is tied in a way that is similar to regular bowlines.

See also
List of knots

References

External links

Double knots